The IBSF World Championships 2017 took place at the Königssee bobsleigh, luge, and skeleton track in Königssee, Germany, from 13 to 26 February 2017.

Schedule
Six events were held.

All times are local (UTC+1).

Medal summary

Medal table

Bobsleigh

Skeleton

Mixed

References

External links
Official website

 
2017
International sports competitions hosted by Germany
2017 in bobsleigh
2017 in skeleton
2017 in German sport
Bobsleigh in Germany
Skeleton in Germany
February 2017 sports events in Germany